McConnell's spinetail (Synallaxis macconnelli) is a species of bird in the family Furnariidae. It is found in Brazil, French Guiana, Guyana, Suriname, and Venezuela.

Its natural habitats are subtropical or tropical moist lowland forests, subtropical or tropical moist montane forests, and heavily degraded former forest.

References

McConnell's spinetail
Birds of the Tepuis
Birds of the Guianas
McConnell's spinetail
Taxonomy articles created by Polbot